Wilson Mountain Reservation is a state-owned, public recreation area and protected woodland park in Dedham, Massachusetts, managed by the Massachusetts Department of Conservation and Recreation. It features hiking trails, open space and a summit view of the Boston skyline, and is an important wildlife preserve. At , it is the largest remaining open space in Dedham. The reservation is part of the Metropolitan Park System of Greater Boston.

In 2008, an agreement was reached between DCR and The Trustees of Reservations to "work jointly to increase stewardship of the property".  However, the 2017 DCR Resource Management Plan for Wilson Mountain called for DCR and The Trustees "to clarify status of the 2008 Memorandum of Agreement and, if appropriate, develop a work plan for future stewardship activities."

Gallery

References

External links

Wilson Mountain Reservation Department of Conservation and Recreation
Blue Hills Complex Resource Management Plan: Section 4.  Wilson Mountain Reservation Department of Conservation and Recreation (view entire document:  https://www.mass.gov/service-details/blue-hills-complex)
Wilson Mountain Reservation Map Department of Conservation and Recreation (note:  map is oriented with south at top)

Parks in Dedham, Massachusetts
State parks of Massachusetts
Parks in Norfolk County, Massachusetts
Open space reserves of Massachusetts
Landforms of Norfolk County, Massachusetts
1994 establishments in Massachusetts
Protected areas established in 1994